"Turn on Me" is a song by American indie rock band The Shins, and is the seventh track on their third album Wincing the Night Away. The song was released as the third single from that album in the UK on September 3, 2007.

The vinyl also came with a special code that could be entered on to www.transgressiverecords.co.uk to receive a 'digital record player', a flash music player that streamed the entire track listing from Wincing the Night Away. Users of the digital player can receive email updates about tracks that will be playing in the future.

Track listings
"Turn on Me" 7":
"Turn on Me"
"Little Boxes"
"Australia" (Peter Bjorn and John remix)

"Turn on Me" download:
"Turn on Me"
"Little Boxes"
"Sea Legs" (DJ Nobody remix)

Music video
The music video for Turn on Me features images of an old woman sun tanning, a man operating a crane, a one-eyed dog in the woman's garden, a man in a speedo fishing leaves out of a pool, a piano, a bee, and some Jell-o.  It begins with close-up shots then pans out to show the mayhem caused by the bee.  At the end, the piano (which was suspended by the crane) is dropped onto the dog by accident.

References

The Shins songs
2007 singles
Songs written by James Mercer (musician)
2007 songs
Sub Pop singles